Deadline Midnight is a British television series which originally aired on ITV between 1960 and 1961. It focuses on the employees of a London daily newspaper.

Cast

Main
 Armine Sandford as Jane Smith
 Jeremy Young as Neville Crane
 Glyn Houston as  Mike Grieves
 Bruce Beeby as Matt Stewart
 Brian Badcoe as 'Robbie' Robinson
 Mary Law as Peggy Simpson
 Alexander Archdale as Holland 
 Vincent Ball as Keith Durrant
 Peter Vaughan as Joe Dunn
 Peter Fraser as Dick Seton
 Pat Gilbert as Jill Collins
 James Culliford as Tom Douglas
 Ballard Berkeley as Desmond
 Basil Moss as John Mundy

Other
A large number of other actors appeared in episodes of the show including Michael Caine, Derek Farr, Harry H. Corbett, Sarah Miles, Nanette Newman, Sydney Tafler, Valerie White, Alethea Charlton, Nyree Dawn Porter, Jane Merrow, George Coulouris, Claire Gordon, Kenneth Cope, Richard Pearson, Dilys Laye, Ronald Lacey, Larry Martyn, Warren Mitchell, Frank Pettingell, Esmond Knight, John Welsh, Michael Robbins, Pamela Brown, Meredith Edwards, Billy Milton, Reginald Marsh, George Woodbridge, Peter Illing, John Ringham, William Kendall, Stratford Johns, John Barrie, Richard Vernon, John Barron, Anthony Sharp, Wensley Pithey, Bernard Archard, Patricia Burke, Bernard Kay, Derek Newark, Timothy West, Frederick Jaeger, Charles Lloyd Pack, Rita Webb, John Arnatt, Neil Hallett, Derek Francis, Arthur Brough, Elsie Wagstaff, Tenniel Evans, Carmen Silvera, Patrick Newell, Desmond Llewelyn, Jennifer Hilary, Allan Cuthbertson, Lloyd Lamble, David Hemmings and James Beck.

Of the 40 episodes produced, two (one and twelve) are missing from ITV's television archives.

References

Bibliography
 Vahimagi, Tise . British Television: An Illustrated Guide. Oxford University Press, 1996.

External links
 

1960 British television series debuts
1961 British television series endings
1960s British drama television series
ITV television dramas
English-language television shows
Television shows produced by Associated Television (ATV)